The Environment of Ecuador contains almost 20,000 species of plants, 1,500 species of birds, 341 species of mammals and more than 840 species of reptiles and amphibians. It includes World Heritage Sites like the Galápagos Islands, and magnificent parks such as the Yasuni National Park.

Damage to the environment

Mining in Ecuador has come at a great environmental cost, though it has provided some financial revenue. Logging and oil exploitation are other major problems. In 2007, president Correa proposed the Yasuní-ITT Initiative so as to allow preserving the Yasuni national park, while still allowing to generate revenue for the country.

Environmental performance
In the Yale University and Columbia University 10 Environmental Performance Index, Ecuador was ranked 30 in the world, ahead of some rich countries.

Ecuador had a 2018 Forest Landscape Integrity Index mean score of 7.66/10, ranking it 35th globally out of 172 countries.

See also
Water supply and sanitation in Ecuador
Chevron Corporation#Environmental damage in Ecuador

References